Betrayer is someone who has caused a betrayal.  It also may refer to:

Books
 Betrayer (novel), a novel by C. J. Cherryh
 The Betrayers, Matt Helm spy novel

Films and games
 Betrayer (film), a 2020 Czech film
 The Betrayer, a 1921 Australian-New Zealand film
 Betrayer (video game), a first-person action-adventure video game released in 2014

Music
 Betrayer (band), an Indonesian musical group that played at Java Rockin'land in 2011
 Betrayer (Argentinian band), a female fronted groove metal band from Buenos Aires, Argentina, supplemented by Johan Liiva